Le Parisien is a French daily newspaper covering both international and national news, and local news of Paris and its suburbs. It is owned by LVMH Moët Hennessy Louis Vuitton SE, better known as LVMH.

History and profile
The paper was established as Le Parisien libéré by Émilien Amaury in 1944, and was published for the first time on 22 August 1944. The paper was originally launched as the organ of the French underground during the German occupation of France in World War II.

The name was changed to the current one in 1986. A national edition exists, called Aujourd'hui en France.

LVMH acquired the paper from Éditions Philippe Amaury in 2015.

Circulation
Le Parisien had a circulation near to one million copies in the early 1970s. The paper reached a circulation of 659,200 copies on 24 April 1995, the day after the first round of the presidential election. In the period of 1995–1996 the paper had a circulation of 451,159 copies.

The combined circulation of Le Parisien was 485,000 copies in 2001. The paper had a circulation of 147,143 copies and a combined circulation of 360,505 copies in 2002. It was the second largest regional newspaper in France with a combined circulation of 530,000 copies in 2008, behind Ouest-France, which had a circulation of about 800,000 copies. The circulation of Le Parisien was 229,638 copies in 2014. The circulation of Le Parisien was 264,952 copies in 2020.

Footnotes

External links

 

1944 establishments in France
Centrist newspapers
Daily newspapers published in France
French news websites
Liberal media in France
LVMH brands
Newspapers published in Paris
Publications established in 1944